A tide mill is a water mill driven by tidal rise and fall. A dam with a sluice is created across a suitable tidal inlet, or a section of river estuary is made into a reservoir.  As the tide comes in, it enters the mill pond through a one-way gate, and this gate closes automatically when the tide begins to fall.  When the tide is low enough, the stored water can be released to turn a water wheel.

Tide mills are usually situated in river estuaries, away from the effects of waves but close enough to the sea to have a reasonable tidal range.  Cultures that built such mills have existed since the Middle Ages, and some may date back to the Roman period.

A modern version of a tide mill is the electricity-generating tidal barrage.

Early history 
Possibly the earliest tide mill in the Roman world was located in London on the River Fleet, dating to Roman times.
 Since the late 20th century, a number of new archaeological finds have consecutively pushed back the date of the earliest tide mills, all of which were discovered on the Irish coast: A 6th-century vertical-wheeled tide mill was located at Killoteran near Waterford. A twin-flume, horizontal-wheeled tide mill, dating to c. 630, was excavated on Little Island in Cork. Alongside it, another tide mill was found that was powered by a vertical undershot wheel. The Nendrum Monastery mill from 787 was situated on an island in Strangford Lough in Northern Ireland. Its millstones are 830mm in diameter and the horizontal wheel is estimated to have developed  at its peak. Remains of an earlier mill dated at 619 were also found at the site.

In England, an exceptionally well preserved tidal mill, dated by dendrochronology to the late 7th century (691-2AD) was excavated in the Ebbsfleet Valley (a minor tributary of the River Thames) in Kent during construction of the Ebbsfleet International Station, on the High Speed 1 railway line<ref></Oxford Wessex Archaeology Joint Venture 2011. Settling the Ebbsfleet Valley. CTRL Excavations at Springhead and Northfleet, Kent. The Late Iron Age, Roman, Saxon, and Medieval Landscape</ref>  The earliest recorded tide mills in England are listed in the Domesday Book (1086). Eight mills  are recorded on the River Lea (the site at Three Mills remains, with Grade I listed buildings and a small museum), as well as a mill in Dover harbour. By the 18th century, there were about 76 tide mills in London, including two on London Bridge.

Woodbridge Tide Mill, an excellent example, survives at Woodbridge, Suffolk, England. This mill, dating from 1170 and reconstructed in 1792, has been preserved and is open to the public. It was further restored in 2010 and re-opened in 2011 in full working order. It is the second working tide mill in the United Kingdom that is regularly producing flour. Carew Castle in Wales also has an intact tide mill, but it is not operating. The first tide mill to be restored to working order is Eling Tide Mill in Eling, Hampshire. Another example, now extant only in historic documents, is the mill in the hamlet of Tide Mills, East Sussex. Traces of a tide mill may be seen at Fife Ness, revealed through an archaeological survey.

A mediæval tide mill still operates at Rupelmonde near Antwerp, and there are several that have survived in the Netherlands.

At one time there were 750 tide mills operating along the shores of the Atlantic Ocean: approximately 300 in North America, including many in colonial Boston over a 150-year span. In addition, 200 have been documented in the British Isles, and 100 in France. The Rance estuary in France was also home to some of these mills.

By the mid-20th century,  the use of water mills had declined dramatically.  In 1938, an investigation by Rex Wailes discovered that of the 23 extant tidal mills in England, only 10 were still working by their own motive power.  Of one at Beaulieu, H. J. Massingham wrote in the 1940s,

Modern examples 

Newer types of tidal power often propose construction of a dam across a large river estuary.  Although hydroelectric power represents a source of renewable energy, each proposal tends to come under local opposition because of its likely adverse effect on coastal habitats.  One proposal, which was developed in 1966, is the Rance barrage, which generates 250MW.  Unlike historical tide mills, which could operate only on an ebb tide, the Rance barrage can generate electricity on both flows of the tide, or it can be used for pumped storage, depending on demand. A less intrusive design is a 1MW free-standing turbine, constructed in 2007 at Strangford Lough Narrows; this site is close to an historic tide mill.

Surviving tide mills in Britain 

 Ashlett Tide Mill, Ashlett, Hampshire (converted as clubhouse)
 Battlesbridge Tide Mill, Battlesbridge, Essex (converted for business) 
 Carew Castle tide mill, Pembrokeshire
 Eling Tide Mill, Eling, Hampshire (working)
 Fingringhoe Tide Mill, Fingringhoe, Essex (house converted)
 Newhaven Tide Mills, otherwise simply Tide Mills, East Sussex (sluice only)
 Pembroke tide mill, Pembrokeshire (mill ponds only)
 Place Mill, Christchurch, Dorset (working order, restored) 
 Quay Mill, Emsworth, Hampshire (converted as clubhouse)
 Three Mills tide mill, Bromley-by-Bow, London
 Thorrington Tide Mill, Thorrington, Essex
 Woodbridge Tide Mill, Woodbridge, Suffolk (working order)

See also 
 Watermills in the United Kingdom
 Windmill
 Horse mill

References

Sources 

 Spain, Rob: "A possible Roman Tide Mill", Paper submitted to the Kent Archaeological Society

Further reading 
 Minchinton, W. E. : "Early Tide Mills: Some Problems", Technology and Culture, Vol. 20, No. 4 (Oct. 1979), pp. 777–786
 Rynne, Colin: "Milling in the 7th Century – Europe’s earliest tide mills", in: Archaeology Ireland 6, 1992

External links 

 Tide Mills in England and Wales - catalogue of tide mills by county
 Nendrum Monastery mill - detailed documentation of excavation
 Tide Mills of Western Europe (Spanish)
 Tide Mill Institute

Grinding mills
Tidal power
Watermills